Lieutenant-General Charles Butler, 1st Earl of Arran (of the second creation), de jure 3rd Duke of Ormonde (1671–1758) was an Anglo-Irish peer. His uncle Richard was the 1st Earl of Arran of the first creation. The titles were re-created for Charles in 1693. His elder brother, the 2nd Duke of Ormonde, was attainted during the Jacobite rising of 1715, but in 1721 Arran was allowed to buy the estate back. At the death of the 2nd Duke, he succeeded as de jure 3rd Duke of Ormonde in the Irish peerage but did not claim the title.

Birth and origin 
Charles was born on 4 September 1671. He was the youngest son of Thomas Butler and his wife Emilia. His father was known as Lord Ossory and was heir apparent of James Butler, 1st Duke of Ormond but predeceased him and so never became duke. His father's family, the Butler dynasty, was Old English and descended from Theobald Walter, who had been appointed Chief Butler of Ireland by King Henry II in 1177.

Charles's mother was Dutch. Her family was a cadet branch of the House of Nassau. Both parents were Protestant. They had married on 17 November 1659 N.S.

{{Tree chart| | | | |JsDO1|y|ElzPr| | | | | |RchKc|boxstyle=border-width: 1px; border-radius: 0.5em;
 |JsDO1=James1st Duke|boxstyle_JsDO1=border-width: 1px; border-radius: 0.5em; background: lavender;
 |ElzPr=ElizabethPreston
 |RchKc=Richard B. |Frncs=FrancesTuchet'}}

He was one of eleven siblings, but not all seem to be known by name. Lists of his brothers and sisters can be found in his father's article.

 Early life 

Charles's father died in 1680 when he was eight years old. In 1688 his grandfather, Lord Ormond, died. Charles's elder brother succeeded as 2nd Duke of Ormond. In 1693, Charles Butler was ennobled as Baron of Cloughgrenan, Viscount of Tullogh and Earl of Arran (of the second creation) in the Peerage of Ireland. Lord Arran, as he was now, was in the following year also made an English peer by creating him Baron Butler of Weston in County Huntingdon, in the Peerage of England.

 Military career 
Arran pursued a career in the Irish army. In 1697 he was appointed Colonel of the 6th Horse (later 5th Dragoon Guards), a post he held until 1703. In 1699 his brother James resigned his place in the bed chamber, which was given to Arran, who thus became Lord of the Bedchamber to King William III, which office he retained until the King's death in 1702. On 24 January 1702 he was promoted Brigadier General. In 1703 Arran was appointed Colonel of the 3rd Troop of Horse Guards, a post he held until 1715. On 1 January 1704 he was promoted Major General.

 Marriage 
On 3 June 1705 he married Elizabeth Crew, daughter of Thomas Crew, 2nd Baron Crew by his second wife, Anne Airmine, daughter of Sir William Airmine, 2nd Baronet, in Oatlands near Weybridge in Surrey. The marriage was to stay childless.

 Further promotions 
On 22 April 1708 he was promoted Lieutenant-General, his final rank in the Army. From November 1712 to 1714 he was Master-General of the Ordnance in Ireland.

 Brother's attainder 
His eldest brother, the 2nd duke of Ormond, got involved in the Jacobite rising of 1715. He was impeached for high treason by Lord Stanhope on 21 June 1715. He was attainted, whereupon all his honours were assumed to have been forfeit. In 1721 Arran was allowed by act of the English Parliament to buy back the family estates that had been forfeited under his brother's attainder.

Arran participated in the Atterbury Plot of the early 1720s. and should have been the commander of all Jacobite forces in England and Ireland. But the plot was betrayed and the rising never took place. On 2 January 1722, the Old Pretender (Jacobite "King James III") created Charles Duke of Arran in the Jacobite Peerage of England.

On 16 November 1745 N.S., his brother died in Avignon. It was later ruled that the attainder, enacted by the Parliament of Great Britain, applied to his British titles (i.e. those in the Peerages of England and Scotland) but not to his Irish titles. Lord Arran therefore de jure succeeded on his brother's death on 5 November 1745 as 3rd Duke of Ormonde in the Peerage of Ireland, but was not aware of this succession and never assumed the title.

The attainders of the Barony of Butler (of Moore Park) and the Lordship of Dingwall would be reversed in 1871. It, therefore, matters how the claims to these titles were transmitted. Both these titles had the particularity of being able to pass through the female line. In 1745 the claim to these titles, therefore, passed to Elizabeth Butler, his brother's only surviving child, who would therefore have been Baroness Dingwall and Baroness Butler in her own right (suo jure). Elizabeth died unmarried in 1750 and the claims passed to Arran, her uncle.

 Death, succession, and timeline 
Lord Arran died at his lodgings at Whitehall on 17 December 1758 and was buried in St. Margaret's Church, Westminster. On his death, the Earldom of Arran, the Barony of Butler (of Weston), and the Jacobite Dukedom of Arran (such as it was) became extinct, along with the Dukedom and Marquessate of Ormonde. The rest of his de jure'' Irish titles, including the Earldom of Ormonde, passed to his kinsman John Butler (de jure 15th Earl), but remained dormant. Arran's considerable estate was inherited by his unmarried sister Amelia and on her death in 1760 to John Butler.

His claims to the Barony of Butler (of Moore Park) and the Lordship of Dingwall passed to his niece, Frances Elliot, eldest daughter of Arran's sister Henrietta who had married the 1st Earl of Grantham. From Frances the claims eventually passed to the Earls Cowper (descendants of Lord Grantham's youngest daughter). In 1871 the attainder was finally reversed in favour of the 7th Earl.

Horace Walpole called Arran "an inoffensive old man, the last male of the illustrious house of Ormond ... and much respected by the Jacobites ...".

Notes and references

Notes

Citations

Sources 

 (for his grandfather)

 
 – N to R (for Ossory under Ormond)
 – Ab-Adam to Basing (for Arran)
 – Dacre to Dysart (for Dingwall)

 – Scotland and Ireland

 (for timeline)
 (for his brother)
 – Viscounts (for Ossory under Butler, Viscount Mountgarrett)

 – From the revolution to the death of George the Second.

 – 1756 to 1760

1671 births
1758 deaths
17th-century Irish people
18th-century Irish people
Charles
British Army lieutenant generals
British Life Guards officers
Chancellors of the University of Oxford
103
Dukes in the Jacobite peerage
Irish Jacobites
Peers created by James Francis Edward Stuart
Peers of Ireland created by William III 
Peers of England created by William III 
People from County Tipperary
Younger sons of earls